Tudor Creek is one of two main water bodies separating Mombasa Island (and the city of Mombasa) from the Kenyan mainland (the other body being Kilindini Harbour).

Before the estuary into the Indian Ocean, the tidal creek passes under the Nyali Bridge, and is bordered to the west by the Makupa Causeway.

Mombasa
Mombasa County
Rivers of Kenya